This is a list of CBeebies shows which are either still airing or expired. The CBeebies website contains most of these shows, which are airing and coming soon on the CBeebies channel.

Current programming

Original programmes

In-house

 Andy's Aquatic Adventures (2020)
 Andy's Baby Animals (2016)
 Andy's Dinosaur Adventures (2014)
 Andy's Dino Toybox (2020)
 Andy's Prehistoric Adventures (2016)
 Andy's Safari Adventures (2018)
 Andy's Secret Hideout (2017)
 Andy's Wild Adventures (2012)
 Baby Jake (2011)
 Biff and Chip (2021)
 Biggleton (2017)
 Catie's Amazing Machines (2018)
 Charlie and Lola (2005)
 Colours (2022)
 Daydreams (2022)
 Dog Squad (2022)
 Down on the Farm (2015)
 Ferne and Rory's Vet Tales (2018)
 Garden Tales (2021)
 Gigglebiz (2009)
 GiggleQuiz (2019)
 Go Jetters (2015)
 Grace's Amazing Machines (2020)
 Happy Tent Tales (2019)
 Hey Duggee (2015)
 Jennies Fitness in 5 (2021)
 JoJo & Gran Gran (2020)
 Junk Rescue (2018)
 Justin's House (2011)
 Katie Morag (2013)
 Kit & Pup (2020)
 Let's Go for a Walk! (2020)
 Love Monster (2020)
 Molly and Mack (2018)
 My First (2016)
 My Pet and Me (2014)
 My Story (2012)
 Nick Cope's Popcast (2020)
 Number 1 Newton Avenue (2021)
 Old Jack's Boat (2013)
 Oti's Boogie Beebies (2020)
 Our Family (2020)
 Poppies (2014)
 Ranger Hamza's Eco Quest (2022)
 Roots and Fruits (2022)
 Sarah & Duck (2013)
 Show Me Show Me (2009)
 Something Special (2003)
 Stargazing (2014)
 Supertato (2022)
 Swashbuckle (2013)
 Teeny Tiny Creatures (2021)
 Tiny Wonders (2022)
 What's on Your Head? (2021)
 Where in the World? (2018)
 Woolly and Tig (2012)
 Yakka Dee! (2017)
 YolanDa's Band Jam (2019)

Commissioned

 Alphablocks (2010)
 Apple Tree House (2017)
 The Baby Club (2019)
 Big Cook, Little Cook (revival series) (2022)
 Bing (2014)
 Bitz and Bob (2018)
 B.O.T. and the Beasties (2021)
 Chuggington (2008)
 Clangers (2015)
 Colourblocks (2022)
 Dipdap (2011)
 Dog Loves Books (2020)
 Footy Pups (2015)
 The Furchester Hotel (2014)
 Get Well Soon (2012)
 Gudrun: The Viking Princess (2018)
 Hushabye Lullabye (2020)
 In the Night Garden (2007)
 Kiri and Lou (2020)
 Let's Play (2012)
 Maddie's Do You Know? (2016)
 Maddie, Space and You (2021)
 Maddie, The Home and You (2021)
 Maddie, The Plants and You (2021)
 Maddie, The Zoo and You (2020)
 Magic Hands (2013)
 Messy Goes to Okido (2015)
 Mister Maker (2007)
 Monty and Co. (2020)
 Moon and Me (2019)
 My Petsaurus (2017)
 My World Kitchen (2018)
 Numberblocks (2017)
 Octonauts (2010)
 Olga da Polga (2022)
 Olobob Top (2017)
 Pablo (2017)
 Patchwork Pals (2016)
 Raa Raa the Noisy Lion (2011)
 School of Roars (2017)
 Small Potatoes (2011)
 Teddles (2019)
 Tee and Mo (2018)
 Teletubbies (revival series) (2015)
 Time for School (2016)
 Timmy Time (2009)
 Tinpo (2018)
 The Toddler Club (2022)
 Topsy and Tim (2013)
 Treasure Champs (2018)
 Tree Fu Tom (2012)
 Twirlywoos (2015)
 Waffle the Wonder Dog (2018)

Acquired programmes

 Arthur
 Blippi Wonders (2022) (iPlayer only)
 Bluey (2021)
 Cocomelon (2021) (iPlayer only)
 Daniel Tiger's Neighbourhood (2022) (iPlayer only)
 Digley and Dazey (2021) (iPlayer only)
 Gecko's Garage (2022) (iPlayer only)
 Ginger and the Vegesaurs (2023)
 Go Buster (2021) (iPlayer only)
 Let's Dance (2022)
 Little Baby Bum (2021) (iPlayer only)
 Octonauts: Above & Beyond 
 Peter Rabbit (2012)
 Pfffirates (2022)
 Pinocchio and Friends (2022)
 Playtime with Twinkle (2021) (iPlayer only)
 Postman Pat (2002)
 Spidey and His Amazing Friends (2022)
 Tik Tak (2020)
 Tish Tash (2021)

Programming blocks
 
 This is CBeebies 5:30 - 6 am (2009–present)
 Get Set Go! 6-9 am (2006–present)
 Discover + Do 9 am-3.15 pm (2007–present)
 Lunch Time Hour 12:00 pm-1:00 pm (2007–present)
 Big Fun Time 3.15-5.45 pm (2007–present)
 Bedtime Hour 5.45 (originally 6pm)-7:00 pm (2003–present)

Upcoming programmes
 Dentist 
 Lellobee City Farm (2023)
 Vida the Vet (Fall 2023)

Former programmes

Original

In-house

 Andy Pandy (2002–2009)
 Balamory (2002–2016)
 Becky and Barnaby Bear (2002–2009)
 Be Safe with the Tweenies (2002–2009)
 Big Cook, Little Cook (original series) (2004–2012)
 Bill and Ben (2002–2011)
 Binka (2002–2005)
 Bitsa (2002–2004)
 Bits and Bobs (2002–2012)
 Bobinogs (2004–2010)
 Boogie Beebies (2004–2014)
 Buzz and Tell (2011–2017)
 Carrie and David's Popshop (2008–2015)
 Dinopaws (2014–2018)
 Doodle Do (2006–2011)
 Fab Lab (2002–2006)
 Feeling Better (2018)
 Fimbles (2002–2012)
 Garth and Bev (2010–2012)
 Green Balloon Club (2008–2014)
 Higgledy House (2002–2009)
 Jackanory Junior (2007–2012)
 Jollywobbles! (2010–2013)
 Kerwhizz (2008–2017)
 LazyTown Extra (2008–2011)
 Let's Celebrate (2010–2018)
 The Let's Go Club (2015-2016)
 The Lingo Show (2012–2020)
 Little Human Planet (2011–2018)
 Little Prairie Dogs (2010–2016)
 Little Robots (2003–2015)
 Magic Door (2016)
 Me Too! (2006–2016)
 Melody (2013–2021)
 Mighty-Mites (2010–2011)
 Mr Bloom's Nursery (2011–2019)
 Nelly and Nora (2015–2020)
 Nina and the Neurons (2007–2020)
 The Numtums (2011–2020)
 Nuzzle and Scratch (2008–2015)
 Oh Yes It Is (2003–2004)
 Our Planet (2007–2012)
 Poetry Pie (2009–2012)
 Razzledazzle (2005–2009)
 The Rhyme Rocket (2012–2014)
 The Roly Mo Show (2004–2009)
 Same Smile (2010–2016)
 The Shiny Show (2002–2009)
 SMarteenies (2002–2008)
 The Song Catcher (2005–2007)
 Space Pirates (2007–2011)
 Spot Bots (2016–2018)
 Step Inside (2002–2010)
 The Story Makers (2002–2009)
 Take a Bow (2007–2010)
 Tellytales (2009–2014)
 Tikkabilla (2002–2014)
 Tiny Tumble (2013–2018)
 Tommy Zoom (2007–2014)
 Zingalong (2002–2004)
 ZingZillas (2010–2017)

Commissioned

 3rd & Bird (2008–2015)
 Abadas (2011–2016)
 The Adventures of Abney & Teal (2011–2019)
 Big and Small (2008–2017)
 Big Barn Farm (2008–2019)
 Big City Park (2010–2014)
 Bob the Builder (2002–2014)
 Boj (2015-2018)
 Boo! (2003–2010)
 Cloudbabies (2012–2017)
 dirtgirlworld (2009–2018)
 Driver Dan's Story Train (2010–2015)
 Everything's Rosie (2010–2018)
 Finley the Fire Engine (2007–2011)
 Get Squiggling (2008–2016)
 Gordon the Garden Gnome (2005–2009)
 Grandpa in My Pocket (2009–2017)
 Guess with Jess (2009–2012)
 I Can Cook (2009–2021)
 Iconicles (2011–2015)
 Jakers! The Adventures of Piggley Winks (2007–2011)
 Jamillah and Aladdin (2015–2019)
 Kate and Mim-Mim (2015–2018)
 Kazoops! (2016)
 The Large Family (2007–2014)
 Little Charley Bear (2011–2015)
 Little Red Tractor (2004–2011)
 Little Roy (2016–2020)
 Mama Mirabelle's Home Movies (2007–2012)
 Mike the Knight (2011–2016)
 Muffin the Mule (2005–2008)
 Numberjacks (2006–2015)
 Pingu (2002–2015)
 Pinky Dinky Doo (2005–2012)
 Q Pootle 5 (2013–2017)
 Rastamouse (2011–2020)
 Rubbadubbers (2002–2008)
 Ruff-Ruff, Tweet and Dave (2015–2019)
 Sergeant Stripes (2003–2004)
 Teacup Travels (2015–2019)
 Teletubbies Everywhere (2002–2006)
 Tilly and Friends (2012–2016)
 Tinga Tinga Tales (2010–2021)
 Underground Ernie (2006–2009)
 Waybuloo (2009–2018)
 Wibbly Pig (2009–2012)
 Wide-Eye (2003–2006)
 Wussywat the Clumsy Cat (2015–2018)

Acquired

 64 Zoo Lane (2002–2019)
 Brum (2002–2012)
 Clifford the Big Red Dog (2002–2013)
 Clifford's Puppy Days (2003–2011)
 Ethelbert the Tiger (2002–2010)
 The Family-Ness (2002)
 Fireman Sam (2002–2008)
 Harry & Toto (2008–2011)
 The Koala Brothers (2003–2016)
 LazyTown (2005–2012)
 Little Bear (2002–2005, BBC One/Two block only)
 Louie (2008–2013)
 Lunar Jim (2006–2012)
 Open a Door (2002–2010)
 Penelope (2009–2012)
 Penelope K, by the way (2010–2012)
 The Pingu Show (2007–2012)
 Polka Dot Shorts (2002–2004)
 Sesame Tree (2008–2013)
 ToddWorld (2006–2011)
 Tots TV (2004–2008)
 Uki (2010–2011)
 What's the Big Idea? (2013–2021)
 Zigby (2009–2014)

Reruns

 The Adventures of Spot (2002–2004)
 Angelmouse (2002–2005)
 Bodger & Badger (2002–2004)
 Come Outside (2002–2012)
 Dr Otter (2002–2005)
 El Nombre (2003–2004)
 Little Big Cat (2008–2014)
 The Magic Key (2003–2005)
 Melvin and Maureen's Music-a-Grams (2007)
 Model Millie  (2007)
 Monster Café (2007)
 Noddy's Toyland Adventures (2002–2005)
 Oakie Doke (2002–2005)
 Pablo the Little Red Fox (2002–2012)
 The Poddington Peas (2002)
 Playdays (2002–2004)
 Spider! (2002–2004)
 Spot's Musical Adventures (2002–2006)
 Storytime (2002)
 Teletubbies (original series) (2002–2015)
 Tweenies (2002–2016)
 Wiggly Park (2002–2004)
 William's Wish Wellingtons (2002−2004)
 Yoho Ahoy (2002–2005)
 Yoko! Jakamoko! Toto! (2009-2011)

Programming blocks
 
 The Carrot Club (2003–2004)
 Pick and Play (2004)
 Pui's Exploring Hour (2004)
 Sid's Fix-It Hour (2004)
 Chris' Sing-Along Hour (2004)
 Sue's Make and Do Hour (2004)
 Nicole's Furry Friends Hour (2004)
 Bear and Butterfly (2005)
 Explorers (2006–2007)
 Little Lunchers (2006–2007)
 Story Corner (2006–2007)
 Busy Beebies (2006–2007)
 Alphabet Time (2006–2007)

References

External links
 CBeebies Shows BBC Page

CBeebies
CBeebies